Richard Twiss was a Native American educator and writer.

Richard Twiss may also refer to:

Richard Twiss (footballer)  (1909–1970), English footballer 
Richard Twiss (writer) (1747–1821), English writer known for books on travel and chess
Richard Q. Twiss (1920–2005), British astronomer